Haefner is a surname. Notable people with the surname include:

Eva Maria Bucher-Haefner (born 1956/1957), Swiss billionaire heiress
Martin Haefner (born 1953/1954), Swiss former billionaire heir
Marsha Haefner (born July 8, 1951), American politician
Mickey Haefner (1912–1995), American baseball player
Walter Haefner (1910–2012), Swiss businessman and a thoroughbred racehorse owner and breeder